David Lyle Jeffrey  (born June 28, 1941) is a Canadian-American scholar of literature and religion, currently a Distinguished Senior Fellow at the Baylor Institute for Studies in Religion. He was elected a Fellow of the Royal Society of Canada (1996-). In 2003 he was given the Lifetime Achievement Award of the Conference of Christianity and Literature.

Education and Career

1965, Jeffrey received his B.A. in English from Wheaton College. In 1968, he received his Ph.D. in English and Comparative Literature from Princeton University under D.W. Robertson, Jr and John V. Fleming. Much of his life has been spent in the rural Ottawa Valley, where he farmed actively for many years simultaneously with his academic vocation. Jeffrey has held professorships at the University of Victoria (1968-1969 and 1973-1978), University of Rochester (1969-1973), University of Ottawa (1978-1996), Augustine College (1997-2000), and Baylor University (2000-), with visiting and guest professorships from Regent College (1970, 1973, and 1976), the University of Notre Dame (1995 and 2002), Peking University (1996–present), as well as the Reckitt Visiting Professorship at the University of Hull (1971-1972). He is Professor Emeritus at the University of Ottawa (since 1996), and Honorary Professor at the University of International Business and Economics in Beijing (2005–present). He was Senior Vice Provost at Baylor University from 2001 to 2003 and Provost from 2003 to 2005, and has been Distinguished Professor of Literature and the Humanities at Baylor from 2000 to his retirement in 2019, teaching mostly in the Honors College and Philosophy Department. He continues as a Distinguished Senior Fellow of the Baylor Institute for Studies in Religion.

Jeffrey is a generalist in the Humanities, most known for his work on the Bible in English literature, his Dictionary of Biblical Tradition in English Literature (1992) having become a standard reference work. He has also worked in biblical translation theory, the history of interpretation, theology and the arts, philosophy of art, and Chinese philosophy and literature. His scholarship is characteristically interdisciplinary and multilingual, yet it can be said to be broadly divisible into three parts.

As a medievalist, especially during the first third of his career, Jeffrey has been associated with the interpretative tradition of D. W. Robertson Jr., an approach which emphasizes medieval European authors’ knowledge of classical and Christian texts as of great importance for understanding their appeal to their original audiences. This contrasts with the opinion advocated by C. S. Lewis and popular in the mid to late twentieth century, namely that a romantic and Celtic mythological substratum is more fundamental. Jeffrey's general method has been to compare the first interpretative horizon of a medieval text with subsequent readings over the centuries, considering reception history not only for the sake of illuminating the text in question more fully, but also for the light cast on cultural change itself.

In this regard, he has given considerable attention to the influence of biblical literature and its Jewish and Christian traditions of commentary. According to Jeffrey, a chief impediment to sound understanding of English literature of any period, including the present, has been the lack of biblical literacy so evident in modernity generally. Since the 1980s, Jeffrey has attempted to remind secular critics of the formative presence of biblical narrative and symbol in the growth of the English poetic imagination. This was a major theme of his Dictionary of Biblical Tradition in English Literature (1992), his People of the Book (1996), and is still evident in his most recent Scripture and the English Literary Imagination (2019). In each of these volumes, Jeffrey tracks the intellectual history of English literary works from the earliest vernacular texts to the works of contemporary poets and novelists. This diachronic historical-philological method is likewise employed in his art criticism. He has edited and translated medieval texts—Latin, French, Italian and Old and Middle English, and published commentary on both Old and New Testaments.

Since the mid 1990s Jeffrey has increasingly turned his attention to comparative literary study of Chinese and Western texts. He has argued that the dominant meta-narrative impulses of the two literary cultures are strikingly opposite teleologically; whereas Western texts tend to privilege leaving the homeland behind in search of a better country (eg. Vergil, Exodus, early American literature), Asian texts may favor going out in search of intellectual treasure but then prioritize bringing it back to the original homeland. Summarily, if for Tom Wolfe, ‘you can’t go home again,’ for Asian texts one must go home again (Dangdai Ouzhou Wenxie Zonghengtan [Beijing: Ethnic Publishing House, 2003]).  He has written of Marxism and Christianity as parallel eschatologies, suggesting that for Chinese intellectuals attracted to Christianity, Marxism has often functioned something like a philosophical John the Baptist, inadvertently preparing the way (2010). Jeffrey's Dictionary (2013) and People of the Book (2004) have appeared in Chinese translation under his Chinese name 谢大卫 (‘Xie Da Wei’), and he has published widely in Chinese academic journals, lecturing there on Chinese as well as Western literary and philosophical texts, including on Confucian ethics at the First Nishan Forum (2009), indicative of an increasing focus in his later years which led to his being asked to give the opening plenary address at the Third World Sinology Conference, held at Renmin University in 2013.

Books

1. Modern Fiction and the Rebirth of Theology (Saratoga: S.U.N.Y. Press, 1973)

2. The Early English Lyric and Franciscan Spirituality (Lincoln, Nebraska: Nebraska University Press, 1975).

3. Editor and Co author, By Things Seen: Reference and Recognition in Medieval Thought (University of Ottawa Press, 1979).

4. Editor and Co author, Chaucer and Scriptural Tradition (University of Ottawa Press, 1984).

5. Toward a Perfect Love: The Spiritual Counsel of Walter Hilton (Portland, Oregon: Multnomah Press, 1986; new edition, Vancouver, Regent Press, 2002). (translation, with introduction and notes).

6. The Fiction of Jack Hodgins (Toronto: ECW Press, 1989).

7. English Spirituality in the Age of Wesley (Grand Rapids:  Eerdmans, 1987). (edition of texts, critical study, introductions, notes).  Second edition 1994; Third edition Vancouver: Regent Press, 2001; 2006. Available as A Burning and Shining Light through Logos Bible Software (2016--)

8. English Spirituality in the Age of Wyclif (Grand Rapids:  Eerdmans, 1988). (translation of texts, critical study, introductions, notes) Second edition Vancouver: Regent Press, 2001; 2006.

9. Editor, with Brian J. Levy, The Anglo Norman Lyric (Toronto:  Pontifical Institute of Mediaeval Studies, 1990; revised second edition by DLJ in 2006). (edition, translation, critical study).

10. General Editor and Co-Author, A Dictionary of Biblical Tradition in English Literature (Grand Rapids: Eerdmans, 1992).

11. People of the Book:  Christian Identity and Literary Culture (Cambridge and Grand Rapids:  Eerdmans, 1996). Chinese translation (2005), by Yi Li, Renmin University Press, Beijing (2004).

12. Editor and co-author, with Dominic Manganiello, Re-Thinking the Future of the University (University of Ottawa Press, 1998).

13. Houses of the Interpreter: Reading Scripture, Reading Culture (Waco, TX: Baylor University Press, 2003).

14. William Cowper: Selected Poetry and Prose, ed. David Lyle Jeffrey (Vancouver: Regent Press, 2006).

15. Editor, with C. Stephen Evans, co-author, The Bible and the University (Milton Keynes and Grand Rapids: Paternoster [UK] and Zondervan [US], 2007).

16. co-author ( 6 of 9 chs), with Gregory Maillet, Christianity and Literature: a Philosophical Perspective (Downers Grove: Inter-Varsity Press, 2010; 2017).

17. Editor, co-author, The King James Bible and the World it Made (Waco: Baylor University Press, 2011).

18. Luke: a Theological Commentary (Grand Rapids: Brazos Press, 2012).

19. A Dictionary of Biblical Tradition in English Literature, translated by Liu Guangyao et al. (Shanghai: Sanlian Academic Press, 2013). Revisions and corrections, plus a new introduction for the Chinese context. 3 vols.

20. In the Beauty of Holiness: Art and the Bible in Western Culture (Grand Rapids and Cambridge: Eerdmans, 2017).

21. Scripture and the English Poetic Imagination (Grand Rapids: Baker Academic, 2019).

Significant Articles

“Journey to the West /Journey to the East: Comparative Masterplots,” in Kevin Yan, ed., European Literature in the Chinese Context (Beijing: Nationalities Press, 2002), [English and Chinese].

“Marxist and Christian Convergence: Interrogating Postmodern Liberalism,” Journal for the Study of Christian Culture 24 (2010), 3-19.[Chinese]

“东方与西方——解决当代问题的古代智慧 [Extreme Income Disparity: Ancient Wisdom as Contemporary Counsel],” Journal of Christian Culture Studies 32. 2 (2014), 3-21.

“The Good and the Good Life: Confucius and Christ,” Journal of Chinese Humanities 1.2 (2015) [Leiden: Brill], 213-230.

谢大卫（David Lyle Jeffrey）：“‘善’与‘善的生活’：孔子与基督”，冯传涛 译，载于《当代儒学》，杨永明主编，桂林：广西师范大学出版社，2015年第8辑，页282-299.

“Poetic Desire and the Laws of Heaven: James Legge’s Shi-jing and the Translation of Consciousness,” in David Jasper, Geng Youzhuang and Wang Hai, ed. A Poetics of Translation Between Chinese and English Literature (Waco: Baylor University Press, 2016), 11-36.

“False Witness and Unjust Judgment in the Middle English Susanna” in Ellen Spolsky, ed. Susannah and the Elders, Judaica Series 20 (Atlanta: Scholar's Press, 1996), 57-72.

“Civic Religion and the First Amendment,” in Marjorie Garber and Rebecca Walkowitz, eds., Under God? (New York: Routledge, 1999), 21-31.

“Tolkien and the Future of Literary Studies,” in Trevor Hart and Ivan Khovacs, eds. Tree of Tales: Tolkien, Literature and Theology (Waco: Baylor University Press, 2007), 55-70.

“Bathsheba in the Eye of the Beholder: Artistic Depiction from the Late Middle Ages to Rembrandt,” in Robert Epstein and William Robins, eds. Sacred and Profane: Essays in Chaucer and Late Medieval Literature (Toronto: University of Toronto Press, 2010). 29-45.

“The Hebrew Bible in Art and Literature,” in Stephen Chapman, ed., The Cambridge Companion to the Hebrew Bible (Cambridge and New York: Cambridge University Press, 2016), 426-466.

“Scripture in the Monastic Studium and the Rise of the Humanities,” in Jens Zimmerman, ed., Re-envisioning Christian Humanism (Oxford University Press, 2017[2016]), 161-72.

“John 8:1-11: Revisiting the pericope adulterae,” in Charles Raith II, ed., The Gospel of John: Theological-Ecumenical Readings (Eugene, OR: Cascade Books, 2017), 50-65; 88-91.

“Bible Translation and the Future of Spiritual Interpretation,” Modern Theology 28.4 (2012), 687-706.

Bio-bibliographical

Transformations in Biblical Literary Traditions: Incarnation, Narrative and Ethics; essays in honor of David Lyle Jeffrey, eds. D. H. Williams and Phillip J. Donnelly (South Bend: Notre Dame University Press, 2014).

References

Baylor University faculty
American theologians
Wheaton College (Illinois) alumni
Princeton University alumni
1941 births
Living people
Fellows of the Royal Society of Canada